Stenhammar may refer to:

 Stenhammar (surname), a Swedish surname
Wilhelm Stenhammar (1871-1927) composer
 Stenhammar Palace, in Södermanland, Sweden
 15239 Stenhammar, a main-belt asteroid